Tommy Robredo was the defending champion, but chose not to participate that year.

Dmitry Tursunov won in the final 7–6(8–6), 1–6, 6–4, against Paul-Henri Mathieu.

Seeds

Draw

Finals

Top half

Bottom half

External links
Draw
Qualifying draw

Singles

pl:Open de Moselle 2008